"What's Another Year" is a song recorded by Irish singer Johnny Logan which was his first Eurovision Song Contest winning song, achieving success in the 1980 edition of the contest, as well as 's second Eurovision victory. Composed by Shay Healy (who also wrote "The Ultimate Country and Western Song" performed by Billy Connolly), the song reached number one on the UK Singles Chart for two weeks in May.

When showband frontman Glen Curtin, the original choice of singer, turned down "What's Another Year", the song was rearranged by Bill Whelan to suit Johnny Logan's singing style. Whelan later composed "Riverdance" for the interval entertainment slot at the 1994 Eurovision Song Contest in Dublin. Musically, the song is easily identifiable by its saxophone introduction played by Scottish musician Colin Tully, who now lives and teaches in Wales. In addition, the song was selected as one of the 14 greatest Eurovision entries in a special to mark the 50th anniversary of the contest. It was covered by Shane MacGowan of The Pogues in the Song for Eurotrash cover album of 1998.

Famously, after being announced as the winner of the Contest, Logan was overcome with emotion and could not achieve the high notes near the end of the song in his reprise. Instead, he called out "I love you Ireland", a phrase he would repeat seven years later.

The song was performed seventeenth on the night, following 's Profil with "Hé, hé M'sieurs dames" and preceding 's Trigo Limpio with "Quédate esta noche". At the close of voting, it had received 143 points, placing 1st in a field of 19.
The song was succeeded as Eurovision winner at the Eurovision Song Contest 1981 by British band Bucks Fizz and the song "Making Your Mind Up".
It was succeeded as Irish representative at the 1981 contest by Sheeba with "Horoscopes".

Johnny Logan released German-language and Spanish-language versions of "What's Another Year".

During the 2020 special Eurovision: Europe Shine a Light, Logan performed the song live in a studio in Dublin. He was backed by the special's presenters Edsilia Rombley, Chantal Janzen and Jan Smit from their studio in Hilversum, and a chorus of Eurovision Song Contest fans from around the world. A short video highlighting Logan's three Eurovision wins (1980 and 1987 as main performer, 1992 as composer) was shown during the instrumental bridge of the song.

Track listing
 European single 7" / 45 RPM single (RL 1005)/(EPC 8572)
A. "What's Another Year"
B. "One Night Stand"

 Spanish single 7" single (EPC 8572)
A. "Por un Año Más" - 3:08
B. "One Night Stand" - 3:52

 West German single 7" single (EPC 8732)
A. "Was Ist Schon Ein Jahr" - 3:08
B. "One Night Stand" - 3:52

Charts

Weekly charts

Year-end charts

References

1980 songs
1980 singles
Johnny Logan (singer) songs
Eurovision songs of 1980
Congratulations Eurovision songs
UK Singles Chart number-one singles
European Hot 100 Singles number-one singles
Number-one singles in Finland
Number-one singles in Israel
Number-one singles in Norway
Number-one singles in Portugal
Number-one singles in Sweden
Eurovision songs of Ireland
Irish Singles Chart number-one singles
Eurovision Song Contest winning songs
Pop ballads
Epic Records singles